A list of rivers of Hamburg, Germany:

A
Alster

B
Berner Au
Bille
Bredenbek

D
Deepenhorngraben
Dove Elbe
Dradenau
Düpenau

E
Elbe
Este

F
Flottbek

G
Glinder Au
Gose Elbe

K
Köhlbrand
Kollau

L
Ladenbek
Lottbek
Luruper Moorgraben

M
Müllergraben

N
Niederelbe
Norderelbe

O
Osterbek
Ottersbek

P
Pepermölenbek

R
Rahlau
Reiherstieg
Rethe
Rodenbek

S
Saselbek
Schillingsbek
Schleemer Bach
Seebek
Süderelbe

T
Tarpenbek

U
Unterelbe

W
Wandse
Wedeler Au

 
Rivers
Hamburg